Chung Shan is a historical alternative spelling of "Zhongshan", a Chinese name. It most commonly refers to:

Sun Yat-sen (1866–1925), pseudonym Chung Shan, Chinese revolutionary and political leader
Chung Shan (warship), a gunboat named after Sun Yat-sen
Zhongshan, a city in Guangdong, China
 Chung Shan Industrial and Commercial School, Daliao District, Kaohsiung, Taiwan

See also
 Zhongshan (disambiguation)